Zemiro is a surname. Notable people with the surname include:

Jane Zemiro (born 1939), Australian academic and writer
Julia Zemiro (born 1967), French-born Australian television presenter, radio host, actress, singer, writer and comedian
Zohar Zimro (or Zemiro; born 1977), Israeli long-distance runner